Herstad is a surname. Notable people with the surname include:

Harry Herstad (1946–2017), Norwegian civil servant, sports administrator and politician
John Herstad (born 1936), Norwegian historian
Svein Olav Herstad (born 1969), Norwegian jazz pianist
Sverre J. Herstad (1905–1999), Norwegian journalist and politician